Aoife M. Foley is an Irish engineer and the Editor in Chief of Renewable and Sustainable Energy Reviews.

Education 
Professor Foley has a Bachelor’s degree in civil engineering (1996), and a PhD in energy engineering (2011) from University College Cork. She graduated Trinity College Dublin with a Master’s degree in environmental & transportation engineering (1999).

Career 
She joined the School of Mechanical and Aerospace Engineering at Queen's University Belfast in 2011 as a Lecturer, she was promoted to Reader 2019. And in July 2022 she was promoted by Progression to full Professor.

Professor Foley's research work focuses on power and gas systems, transport electrification, wind power integration, and wind forecasting. She is an expert in application of her field towards the Sustainable Development Goals.

Before working at Queen’s University, she worked at the University College Cork's School of Engineering as a lecturer and as a research fellow at the Environmental Protection Agency.

Prior to joining academia in 2009, she has worked on energy, pharmaceutical, telecommunications, and waste projects for ESB International (engineering consultants), PM Group (project management company), Siemens, and SWS Energy (Irish energy company).

She is the Editor in Chief of Renewable and Sustainable Energy Reviews and serves on the Editorial Board of Elsevier’s Renewable Energy journal.

References 

Living people
Academic journal editors
Irish women engineers
Alumni of University College Cork
Alumni of Trinity College Dublin
Academics of Queen's University Belfast
Year of birth missing (living people)